The Tabasaran Principality or Principality of Tabasaran was an independent monarchic state in southern Dagestan, existing from 1642 until the later 19th century. It emerged as one of many smaller states from the disintegration of the Shamkhalate of Gazikumukh in 1642. It was located in the Samur river valley, roughly coinciding with the region in which the Tabasaran people still reside today. Its location close to the main road between Derbent and Shirvan gave it some strategic importance.

The population of the principality was mainly composed of Tabasarans and Lezgins, and minor Caucasian tribes such as Tsakhurs, Rutuls and Aguls. The state was governed by two sovereigns, one of which was called Ghāzī, the other Ma‘ṣūm. It could mobilize an army of 500 cavalrymen.

The independence of the principality came to an end in the course of the Russian conquest of the Caucasus. Today the region is part of the Dagestan Republic within the Russian Federation.

Literature
 Marie Broxup, The North Caucasus Barrier: The Russian Advance Towards the Muslim World, C. Hurst & Co. Publishers, 1996, p. 34

References

Dagestan
History of Dagestan
Former monarchies of Europe
States and territories established in 1642